is a Japanese manga series created by Katsumi Yamaguchi and Team39. The manga began serialization in the now-defunct seinen manga magazine Weekly Young Sunday in November 1996, and compiled into 31 volumes released between May 1997 and November 2004. The series also spanned into a live action film (V-Cinema) and a CD drama. There were plans for an anime and OVA, but there were no further reports about production. The story revolves around Ryoko Shino, a Japanese high school senior and a former track star who gets into street racing after breaking her Achilles tendon. The tagline for the series is "A Legend of Ultimate Hot Rodder".

Summary

A high school girl and former track runner, Ryoko Shino is out one night with her friends and sees a Nissan Skyline GT-R R32 and Nissan Silvia S13 drifting in tandem just feet in front of her. Instead of being terrified, she can't help but be captivated by the scene. She notices that the Silvia S13's driver is a woman. Ryoko borrows a car magazine from her friend, Toru Takeuchi, and sees there's an article on the Silvia S13 and its driver that she previously saw.

Toru then takes Ryoko for a drive since he recently got his license and takes her to see a drifting practice session at the docks. There Ryoko sees the Silvia S13 and finds out that the driver of the Skyline R32 was Toru's older brother, Takao Takeuchi. Ryoko meets the female driver, who introduces herself as Sawako Morita, and Ryoko tells Sawako she saw her drifting on the mountain that one night. Sawako tells Ryoko that she learned to drift very quickly and that Ryoko could also learn, so she offers to teach Ryoko in her Silvia.

The next day after school, Ryoko goes car shopping with Toru. She tries to look for a good sports car, but they are too expensive for her. Toru mentions that she may find a car at a junkyard for cheap. She wanders around looking for a scrapped car and finds an old man named Akaoka in a junkyard. She tells him that she really wants a sports car and he sells her a blue mica supercharged Toyota MR2 (AW11) for fairly cheap.

While practicing driving and getting her license, Ryoko later meets other skilled female drivers and continues to learn more about driving. Not only does she participate in street racing, but also circuit racing while learning mechanics, independence, and other life lessons.

Characters

Main characters

Supporting characters

TEAM39
TEAM39 is the name for the staff who collaborated with Yamaguchi on the manga.

 Yuji Matsuda (松田勇次) - Co-screenplay writer & technical writer
 Iwami Yoshiro (岩見吉郎) - Co-screenplay writer
 Akihiko Tajima (田島昭彦) -  Mac Design
 Hiroto Hirose (広瀬直人) - Editor

Media

Manga

 Over Rev! Manga Original Japanese Release – 31 Volumes (1997–2004)
 Over Rev! Manga Japanese Re-release – 15 Volumes (2008–2009)

The original tankōbon manga of the series was created by Katsumi Yamaguchi (山口かつみ) and Team39. It began serialization in seinen manga magazine Weekly Young Sunday and has a total of 31 volumes that were released between May 1997 and November 2004. The manga cover art contains the main characters and featured cars.

In 2008, the manga collection was re-released in bunkoban format, which maintained the same story, but with thicker volumes with a total of 15 volumes and different cover art with a black background that focused only on the featured cars.

Over Rev! was officially published in traditional Chinese (title: 極速傳說) and Indonesian by Comics World (Hong Kong) and Level Comics, respectively.

Sequel

On March 14, 2019, a manga sequel called  was released online with its first chapter. The setting takes place 10 years after Ryoko returns to Japan and meets a new character named Moto, a high school girl who also loves cars.

Live action film

The series was adapted into live action film and was released as direct to video (V-Cinema), starring Chika Mitsubayashi (三林千夏) as Ryoko Shino. The movie began its rental release on April 26, 2001 and only available on VHS. It was directed by Atsushi Muroga, who also directed the 2009 Wangan Midnight live action film that is also based on street racing manga with the same name.

CD drama

Bandai Music Entertainment released a 46-minute CD drama of the manga series on April 21, 1999.

Cast

 Yukiko Mannaka as Ryoko Shino
 Michiko Neya as Sawako Morita
 Kumiko Nishihara as Aika Katayama
 Nana Mizuki as Sari Tachibana
 Atsushi Kisaichi  as Toru Takeuchi
 Toshiyuki Morikawa as Takao Takeuchi

Track listing

 Chapter 1: これからの助走
 Chapter 2: こんなんじゃ迷走
 Chapter 3: このまんま疾走
 Chapter 4: あたしのスタートライン

Anime and OVA

There were plans for an anime and original video animation (OVA) adaptation of the manga. Takao Yoshioka, most known for his work on other anime such as Your Lie in April, Working!!, No Matter How I Look at It, It's You Guys' Fault I'm Not Popular!, and Elfen Lied, would be in charge Over Rev!'''s screenplay and series composition. Yoshioka stated that the animation would cover material up to volume 3 in the manga, but the series did not reach production.

Merchandise

There is limited merchandise for Over Rev! including keychains, cellphone charms, car models, and toys.

In popular culture

References

External websites
 

1996 manga
Japanese auto racing films
Manga adapted into films
Manga series
Motorsports in anime and manga
Seinen manga
Shogakukan manga